Fairview is an unincorporated community in Fayette County, in the U.S. state of Ohio.

History
Fairview was laid out on a farm. It became a railroad station and local shipping point of grain.

References

Unincorporated communities in Fayette County, Ohio
Unincorporated communities in Ohio